Indonesian National Route 12 is a relatively short, yet heavily used road in the national route system. It serves as one of the major arteries in the Jabodetabek region (also known as Greater Jakarta), as the road spans through areas considered as part of the metropolitan area itself. 
Despite its location, it spans through three provinces, that is Jakarta, Banten, and West Java, as the road itself connects Senayan, South Jakarta, Jakarta on the northern end, with Bogor, Bogor Regency, West Java in its southern end. 

Because of its heavy use and presence in Greater Jakarta, this route is notorious for having heavy traffic, particularly during the rush hour. This route is also known as the only national route left to have access towards Jakarta, as another national route (the Indonesian National Route 2) has already been transformed into a toll road.

Route

Jakarta
Senayan - Kebayoran Lama - Pondok Indah - Lebak Bulus

Banten
Ciputat - Pamulang - Pondok Cabe

West Java
Bojong Sari - Sawangan - Parung - Kemang - Semplak - Bogor

References

http://hubdat.dephub.go.id/keputusan-dirjen/tahun-2007/561-keputusan-dirjen-no-sk-930aj/download 

http://hubdat.dephub.go.id/keputusan-dirjen/tahun-2008/562-peraturan-dirjen-sk-1207aj/download 

Indonesian National Routes
Transport in West Java
Transport in Banten